GWR 2800 Class No. 2807 is one of the surviving members of the Great Western Railway's 2800 Class of 2-8-0 steam locomotives, also known as the 28XX class.

2807 holds multiple records due to its age; it is,
the oldest survivor of the 2800 Class
the oldest survivor of George Jackson Churchward's standard locomotives
the oldest locomotive built by the Great Western Railway which is now privately owned
the oldest locomotive saved from Woodham Brothers scrapyard at Barry, Wales.

No. 2807 was completed in August 1905 and not withdrawn until March 1963, completing just over 58 years of service. No. 2807 arrived at Woodham Brothers scrapyard in Barry, Vale of Glamorgan, South Wales during November 1963.

Over 17 years later, in 1981, she was saved and moved to Toddington railway station on the Gloucestershire Warwickshire Railway and restored to steam in 2010. The locomotive performed well for its ten-year ticket, which expired at the end of 2019 and it is receiving a ten-yearly overhaul.

References

External links
 Cotswold Steam Preservation Ltd. - Owners of No. 2807

2-8-0 locomotives
2807
Locomotives saved from Woodham Brothers scrapyard
Standard gauge steam locomotives of Great Britain
Articles containing video clips